Empire Exhibition may be:

British Empire Exhibition, held in London in 1924 and 1925
Empire Exhibition, Scotland 1938, held in Glasgow
South Africa's Empire Exhibition, Johannesburg, 1936-7